Farrell House may refer to:

Farrell House (Los Feliz, Los Angeles, California), a work by architect Lloyd Wright
Farrell Houses, in Little Rock Arkansas
Farrell House (2121 Louisiana, Little Rock, Arkansas), listed on the National Register of Historic Places (NRHP)
Farrell House (2115 Louisiana, Little Rock, Arkansas), NRHP-listed
Farrell House (2111 Louisiana, Little Rock, Arkansas), NRHP-listed
Farrell House (2109 Louisiana, Little Rock, Arkansas), NRHP-listed

See also
Farrell Block, Hastings, Nebraska, NRHP-listed
Farrell Building, Camas, Washington, NRHP-listed
Templar-Farrell Motor Sales Building, Cleveland, Ohio, NRHP-listed